The Marta Police Department (MPD) is a 400 sworn officers transit authority accredited police force using car patrols, funeral escort motorcycles, bicycles and K-9s for the Metropolitan Atlanta Rapid Transit Authority, in the Atlanta metropolitan area. It is the ninth largest police force in the State of Georgia. They are located at, 2424 Piedmont Rd, Atlanta, GA.

Chief of Police 
Chief of Police:  since 2020, the chief of MARTA police is M. Scott Kreher.

References

Transit police departments of the United States